The 1974 World Series of Poker (WSOP) was a series of poker tournaments held in May 1974 at Binion's Horseshoe.

Preliminary events

Main Event

There were 16 entrants to the main event in 1974. Each paid $10K to enter the winner-take-all tournament.

Final table

Notes

External links
Official site

World Series of Poker
World Series of Poker